The Japanese basketball league system, or Japanese basketball league pyramid is a series of interconnected competitions for professional basketball clubs in the country of Japan. The system has a hierarchical format with a promotion and demotion system between competitions at different levels.

Men

The tier levels

Women

The tier levels

Cup competitions
B.League Early Cup
Emperor's and Empress's Cup
Japan Society Basketball Championship
National Sports Festival of Japan

See also
League system
European professional club basketball system
Spanish basketball league system
Greek basketball league system
Italian basketball league system
French basketball league system
Russian basketball league system
Turkish basketball league system
German basketball league system
Serbian basketball league system
Polish basketball league system
South American professional club basketball system

References

External links
Japan Basketball Federation 

B.League
Basketball league systems
 
Sports league systems in Japan